Klutlan Glacier is a  long glacier in the U.S. state of Alaska. It is located southwest of Mount Nazirean and flows east across the border with Canada, then north to form the headwaters of the Klutlan River. Its native name was reported in 1891 by C. W. Hayes of the United States Geological Survey.

See also
 List of glaciers

References

Glaciers of Alaska
Glaciers of Copper River Census Area, Alaska
Glaciers of Unorganized Borough, Alaska
Glaciers of Yukon